Raising the Wind is a 1925 British silent-era short comedy film directed by Leslie S. Hiscott and featuring Sydney Fairbrother and Irene Tripod.

References

External links

1925 films
British comedy films
1925 comedy films
1920s English-language films
British silent short films
British independent films
Films directed by Leslie S. Hiscott
British black-and-white films
1920s British films
Silent comedy films